Nationality words link to articles with information on the nation's poetry or literature (for instance, Irish or France).

Events
April – Robert Browning settles with his wife Elizabeth Barrett Browning in Florence
Between July and October – Rev. Henry Francis Lyte composes the hymn "Abide with Me" a few months before his death
September 16 – William Shakespeare's house of birth in Stratford-upon-Avon in England is bought by the United Shakespeare Company for preservation; this year also, Schiller's house in Weimar is opened to the public as a museum

Works published in English

United Kingdom
 Edwin Atherstone, The Fall of Nineveh, enlarged (from the 1828 edition) to 30 books
 Richard Harris Barham, writing under the pen name "Thomas Ingoldsby, Esq.", The Ingoldsby Legends; or, Mirth and Marvels, verse fiction; illustrated by George Cruikshank and John Leech (see also Ingoldsby Legends 1840, 1842)
 Caroline Clive, writing under the pen name "V", The Queen's Ball
 Walter Savage Landor, The Hellenics of Walter Savage Landor
 Christina Rossetti, Verses by Christina G. Rossetti
 Percy Bysshe Shelley, The Works of Percy Bysshe Shelley, edited by Mary Shelley; posthumous
 Robert Southey and Caroline Southey, Robin Hood
 Alfred Tennyson's The Princess, including "Tears, Idle Tears"

United States
 William Ellery Channing, Poems, Second Series
 Philip Pendleton Cooke, Froissart Ballads, and Other Poems, Philadelphia: Cary and Hart
 Ralph Waldo Emerson, Poems
 Fitz-Greene Halleck, The Poetical Works of Fitz-Greene Halleck
 Charles Fenno Hoffman, Love's Calendar; Lays of the Hudson and Other Poems
 Henry Wadsworth Longfellow, Evangeline: A Tale of Acadie
 Epes Sargent, Songs of the Sea With Other Poems
 William Wetmore Story, Poems

Works published in other languages
 Heinrich Heine, Atta Troll, German long narrative poem on political and cultural topics
 Raja Ali Haji or his sister Saleha, Syair Abdul Muluk, Malay syair
 Petar II Petrović-Njegoš, Prince-Bishop of Montenegro, The Mountain Wreath (Горски вијенац, Gorski vijenac), Serbian epic verse drama

Births
Death years link to the corresponding "[year] in poetry" article:
 February 10 – Nabinchandra Sen নবীনচন্দ্র সেন (died 1909), Indian, Gujarati-language poet and writer
 April 7 – Jens Peter Jacobsen (died 1885), Danish poet
 September 22 –- Alice Meynell, née Thompson (died 1922), English poet, writer, editor, critic and suffragist
 December 1 – Julia A. Moore, the "Sweet Singer of Michigan" (died 1920), American poet, famed for her notoriously bad poetry
 Date not known – Brij Raj (died 1919), Indian, Dogri-Pahadi Brajbhasha poet

Deaths
Birth years link to the corresponding "[year] in poetry" article:
 July 21 – William Shepherd (born 1768), English dissenting minister, politician, poet and writer 
 September 10 – Richard Henry Wilde (born 1789), Irish-born American lawyer, politician and poet
 November 20 – Henry Francis Lyte (born 1793), Scottish-born English Anglican divine and hymn-writer
 December 30 – Sima Milutinović Sarajlija (born 1791), Bosnian–Serbian poet, hajduk, translator, historian, philologist, diplomat and adventurer
 Date not known – Liang Desheng (born 1771), Chinese poet and writer during the Qing Dynasty

See also

 19th century in poetry
 19th century in literature
 List of years in poetry
 List of years in literature
 Victorian literature
 French literature of the 19th century
 Biedermeier era of German literature
 Golden Age of Russian Poetry (1800–1850)
 Young Germany (Junges Deutschland) a loose group of German writers from about 1830 to 1850
 List of poets
 Poetry
 List of poetry awards

Notes

19th-century poetry
Poetry